Lingo Point, Delaware is a point of land at the mouth of Lingo Creek at the western limit of Indian River Bay, 7.5 miles northeast of Frankford in Sussex County, Delaware; a variant of the name is Lingos Point.

References

Headlands of Delaware
Landforms of Sussex County, Delaware